The Centre for Fine Arts is a multi-purpose cultural venue in Brussels, Belgium. It is often referred to as BOZAR (a homophone of Beaux-arts) in French or PSK in Dutch. The building was designed by the architect Victor Horta, and completed in 1929 at the instigation of the banker and patron of the arts Henry Le Bœuf. It includes exhibition and conference rooms, a cinema and a concert hall, which serves as home to the National Orchestra of Belgium.

History

Construction (1923–1929)

Victor Horta began designing the Centre for Fine Arts in Brussels following World War I, in a more geometric style than his previous works, similar to Art Deco. The Belgian Parliament initially denied funding for the plans. With the founding of the Société du Palais des Beaux-Arts in 1922, the project was revived. Construction started in 1923, albeit with several restrictions: the Brussels authorities supplied a very irregular area on the slope between the city's upper and the lower part, the main facade had to house shopping facilities, and the height of the building was restricted so as not to compromise the King's view of Brussels' skyline from the Royal Palace.

The building was originally intended to be built of stone, but Horta made a new plan of reinforced concrete with a steel frame. He had intended the concrete to be left exposed in the interior, but the final appearance did not meet his expectations, and he had it covered. It took more than a decade to complete the complex, which contains a large concert hall—the Henry Le Bœuf Hall—in an unusual ovoid, or egg shape. It is accompanied by a recital room, a chamber music room, lecture rooms, and a vast gallery for temporary exhibitions. He managed to put together this array of different functions on a rather small building plot with restricted conditions using more than eight building levels with a large part situated underground.

Contemporary (2000–present)
Since 2002, the Belgian federal intuition has chosen the brand name BOZAR, which has eight artistic departments: BOZAR Expo, BOZAR Music, BOZAR Cinema, BOZAR Dance, BOZAR Theatre, BOZAR Literature, BOZAR Studios and BOZAR Architecture. BOZAR is home to the National Orchestra of Belgium, the /, which invites the world's major orchestras and performers to appear at the Henry Le Bœuf Hall. The finals of the Queen Elisabeth Competition for classical singers and instrumentalists, one of the most challenging and prestigious competitions of the kind, are also held there. Up to ten exhibitions a year are organised at BOZAR, and have included Jeff Wall, Luc Tuymans, Frida Kahlo, Lucas Cranach, Gilbert & George, Wim Delvoye, Venetian, Flemish Masters, Keith Haring and "It's not only rock'n'roll Baby".

Directors
 Robert, 7th Duke d'Ursel, President of the Centre for Fine Arts
 1974–1986 Karel Geirlandt, Director-General of exhibitions of the Centre for Fine Arts 
 1998–2021: Etienne Davignon, President of the Centre for Fine Arts
 2002–2021: Paul Dujardin, Director-General of BOZAR
 15 October 2021–29 May 2022: Sophie Lauwers, Director-General of BOZAR for a brief period of seven months

Facilities
 Henry Le Bœuf Hall, with seating capacity for 2,200
 Chamber Music Room, with seating capacity for 476
 Victor Horta Hall (Great Sculpture Hall)
 Studio Recital Hall, with seating capacity for 210
 Salle Terarken, a multi-purpose hall
 Exhibition rooms

Gallery

See also
 Art Deco in Brussels
 History of Brussels
 Culture of Belgium

References

Notes

External links

 
 

Buildings and structures completed in 1928
Concert halls in Belgium
Culture in Brussels
Museums in Brussels
Victor Horta buildings
Event venues established in 1928
1928 establishments in Belgium
Art Deco architecture in Belgium
City of Brussels